Karl Kevin Marginson (born 11 November 1970) is an English football manager and former player, who played in the Football League for Rotherham United. He became FC United of Manchester's first manager on 22 June 2005, guiding them to four promotions to reach the National League North before leaving by mutual agreement on 24 October 2017.

Playing career
As a player, Marginson played for the Football League clubs Blackpool, Rotherham United and Macclesfield Town. He also has extensive experience of non-league football in the north-west of England having played for Salford City, Hyde United, Stalybridge Celtic, Barrow, Chorley, Droylsden  and Curzon Ashton. He spent the 2004–05 season playing in the North West Counties Football League with First Division Bacup Borough.

In terms of silverware, his most successful period was from 1996 to 1998. In 1995–96 he won the FA Trophy at Wembley with Macclesfield Town. The following year, again with Macclesfield, he went on to win the Conference title and promotion to the football league. In 1997–98 he won the Northern Premier with Barrow AFC, scoring the title clinching goal against nearest rivals Boston Utd.

Management career
On 22 June 2005, he was appointed as the first ever manager of FC United of Manchester  after one of their players, Joz Mitten, recommended him to the board and led the team to immediate success by achieving promotion in each of their first three seasons. The club currently play in the National League North, the sixth tier of English football, after gaining promotion in the 2014–15 season by winning the Northern Premier League Premier Division title. In the 2010–11 season, Marginson led them into the FA Cup proper for the first time, where they upset Rochdale to reach the second round. Marginson is regularly celebrated by fans of the club at matches, home and away, due to these achievements. For the first five seasons, he led the club on a semi-professional basis but later gave up his fruit and vegetable delivery business to work full-time for FC United, a role which included involvement in the club's community work such as coaching youngsters and other groups. On 24 October 2017, Marginson left his post as manager at F.C. United by mutual agreement.

In November 2018 he was appointed Head of Football Operations at Radcliffe F.C.

Managerial statistics 

 statistics source from www.soccerbase.com

References

 Match programme, F.C. United of Manchester v Blackpool Mechanics, 10 September 2005

External links
Marginson's profile at Soccerbase

1970 births
Living people
Footballers from Manchester
English footballers
Association football midfielders
Blackpool F.C. players
Chorley F.C. players
Curzon Ashton F.C. players
Droylsden F.C. players
Ashton United F.C. players
Rotherham United F.C. players
Macclesfield Town F.C. players
Barrow A.F.C. players
Stalybridge Celtic F.C. players
Hyde United F.C. players
Salford City F.C. players
Radcliffe F.C. players
Flixton F.C. players
Bacup Borough F.C. players
F.C. United of Manchester players
English football managers
F.C. United of Manchester managers